Kim Rosdahl (born 12 May 1996) is a Swedish professional ice hockey winger. He is currently playing with Malmö Redhawks in the Swedish Hockey League (SHL). He has previously played with IK Oskarshamn and Rögle BK in the SHL.

References

External links
 

1996 births
Living people
Rögle BK players
IK Oskarshamn players
Malmö Redhawks players
Modo Hockey players
Sportspeople from Malmö
Swedish ice hockey left wingers